Nochimalai is a village in Tiruvannamalai taluk, Tiruvannamalai district, Tamil Nadu. Nochimalai is 6 km far from Tiruvannamalai and 157 km from Chennai.

Nochimalai is near: Thandrampet block (15.2 km), Thurinjapuram (18.1 km), Kalasapakkam(23.1 km), Kizh-pennathur (24.4 km) .

Demographics
Nochimalai has a population of over 5,500. There is one railway station for Nochimalai at Tindivanam railway route.

References

External links

Cities and towns in Tiruvannamalai district